"Express Yourself" is a song recorded by American hip hop group N.W.A, performed solo by Dr. Dre. The song, off their 1988 album Straight Outta Compton, samples Charles Wright & the Watts 103rd Street Rhythm Band's song of the same name. Unlike most songs on the album and by N.W.A, the song is devoid of profanity and violence. "Express Yourself" was released in 1989 as the album's last single, the album version of the track features rap vocals from Dr. Dre only whereas the 2002 reissue, single edition and video version features small verses from MC Ren and Ice Cube, the writer of the song. The song reached number 26 in the UK in September 1989.

History 
The song's vocals are primarily handled by Dr. Dre though an extended version features interludes from Ice Cube and MC Ren. The song samples Charles Wright & the Watts 103 Street Rhythm Band's hit, also titled "Express Yourself" (1971).

The song's lyrics focus on the concept of free expression and the constraints placed on rappers by radio censorship. The song is notable for including lines criticising other rappers for not swearing in order to get radio airplay despite the song itself containing no profanity, being based on a pop music sample with a clearly 'radio friendly' tone.

In May 1990, the Australian Broadcasting Corporation's music radio station Triple J notably stunted by playing "Express Yourself" on a loop. The station's staff had gone on strike over the suspension of Triple J's news director, Nick Franklin, after he had played a portion of fellow N.W.A. song "Fuck tha Police" in a segment discussing the song's subject matter. The station had, notably, been playing the song without incident for several months, but ABC's radio head had requested that the song be given a "rest". The song was played 82 times in a row until the employee was reinstated. Triple J paid tribute to the event in April 2014, when the launch of its new service Double J (which replaced ABC Dig Music) was preceded with another loop of "Express Yourself", including the original recording and covers performed by Australian musicians, such as Darren Hanlon and The Audreys.

Music video
The music video starts with a black and white video of slaves working on a plantation. As they escape, the video transitions to the ghetto, as the band members walk through it and dance with the local residents. A "No Rapping" sign is shown. A mounted officer (played by Skeeter Rader) enforces the law on the crowd. Occasionally band members are depicted rapping in a prison environment. Later on Dr. Dre plays the role of the US president. At one point he is talking on the phone with Mikhail Gorbachev, and a photo of Martin Luther King Jr. can be seen in the background. One of King's quotes, the famous "I Have a Dream", also appears on a large sign that the band members walk through as the song properly begins. A parody of the assassination of John F. Kennedy follows. The video ends with Dr. Dre being executed in an electric chair. In the version appearing on the EMI YouTube channel and on N.W.A's official VEVO channel on YouTube, numerous parts are blurred out including logos and faces. Despite this, the complete uncensored video can still be found online.

Cover versions and samples

German metal band Rammstein sampled the intro in their song "Klavier" for the 1997 album Sehnsucht.

Silkk the Shocker recorded a version of the song for the 1998 N.W.A tribute album, Straight Outta Compton: N.W.A 10th Anniversary Tribute. The recording was also was released as a single with a promotional music video.

Between the Rancid releases of ...And Out Come the Wolves and Life Won't Wait from 1995 to 1998, Tim Armstrong recorded a version of "Express Yourself" with the band The Silencers on the Life Won't Wait demos. The first half of the demo consists of Rancid demos and the second half consists of The Silencers demos.

Stretch Arm Strong recorded a version of "Express Yourself" for the 2003 album Engage.

Labrinth recorded a cover version of the song for his 2012 album Electronic Earth: the song was released as a single and reached the UK top 20.

The Basque band Negu Gorriak featured a Basque language version, titled "Adieraz zaitez", on their 1996 covers album Salam, agur.

In media 
"Express Yourself" is featured in the video games Tony Hawk's Pro Skater 4, EA's Skate, and Grand Theft Auto: San Andreas on the in-game station Radio Los Santos.

Track listing 
 "Express Yourself" (Extended Mix) – 4:42
 "Bonus Beats" – 3:03
 "Straight Outta Compton" (Extended Mix) – 4:54
 "A Bitch Iz a Bitch" – 3:10

Charts

Certifications

References

External links 

1989 singles
N.W.A songs
Song recordings produced by Dr. Dre
1988 songs
Ruthless Records singles
Songs written by Ice Cube
Songs written by MC Ren
Political rap songs